Masubuchi (written:  or ) is a Japanese surname. Notable people with the surname include:

, Japanese softball player
, Japanese baseball player

Japanese-language surnames